The Journal of Human Values is a Peer reviewed academic journal published by SAGE publications. The journal publishes articles exploring the relevance of human values, human values at the organizational level, and the culture-specificity of human values. In addition to articles, the Journal of Human Values publishes book reviews.

Abstracting and indexing 
Journal of Human Values is abstracted and indexed in:
 SCOPUS
 DeepDyve
 Portico
 Dutch-KB
 EBSCO
 OCLC
 Ohio
 ICI
 Global Institute for Scientific Information
  ProQuest Technical Information
 J-Gate
 Thomson Reuters: Emerging Sources Citation Index (ESCI)

External links 
 
 Homepage

Business and management journals
Publications established in 1995
SAGE Publishing academic journals
Biannual journals